Jhilli is a Bengali language film written and directed by Ishaan Ghose in 2021 and produced by Goutam Ghose Associates. The film is about a boy named Bokul who resolves to make changes in his life after realizing that most of his friends are leaving him behind in the debris of discards.

Plot 
Bokul, a fourth-generation manual laborer, toils in the largest trash yard in Kolkata at a facility that crushes bones. He makes the most of his existence in his environment while being unaware of his difficulties. He has no idea that the outside world is transforming quickly and preparing for a new economic boom. His entire world was exchanged for a recreation area.

Cast 

 Bitan Biswas as Ganesh
 Shombhunath De as Shombhu
 Sayandeep Guha as Guddu
 Aranya Gupta as Bokul
 Sourav Nayak as Chompa

Production 
The film was shot with a Sony a7sii camera and one lens – a Canon 16-35mm – on a hand-held stabilizer. With the lack of sound equipment, the sound was recreated completely in post-production with Aneesh Basu, which took a year during the pandemic. This was a self-funded production which had no shooting script and was heavily improvised.

Awards

Reception 

 There is hardship and suffering, but there is also a sense of belonging that is unmatched elsewhere. Nothing about Jhilli is fictitious. The existence of those among us who have been stripped off their identities and denied access to necessities of life. In this film, the protagonists are denied the opportunity to discover who they are. Instead, all they want is to live.
 Ghose's film reveals a delirious and slurred story of a group of pals that drift in and out of each other's lives as they try to earn a livelihood from Dhapa or come up with wacky escape plans that are doomed to failure in this dystopian terrain.

References

External links 

 
2021 films
Films shot in West Bengal
Bengali-language Indian films
Indian drama films
2020s Indian films
2020s Bengali-language films